The CP Class 1400 are a series of 67 diesel-electric locomotives built for the Portuguese Railways (CP) between 1967 and 1969. They have a top speed of 105 km/h.

They were ordered primarily to replace steam locomotives then still in use on CP. Designed and engineered by English Electric, they are closely modelled mechanically on the British Rail Class 20 locomotives but using a more powerful intercooled 1,330 bhp 8CSVT version of the Class 20's 8SVT engine. The first ten were built in England at the Vulcan Foundry in Newton-le-Willows, with the remaining locomotives assembled in Portugal by Sorefame. The locomotives share many components with the larger and more powerful Class 1800.

During the early years of the 21st century, some were sold for further service in Argentina, but as of 2012 many remain in service with CP.

References

External links

Diesel-electric locomotives of Portugal
English Electric locomotives
Railway locomotives introduced in 1967
Vulcan Foundry locomotives